is a mini album by visual kei rock group La'Mule.

Track listing

References

Japanese-language albums
La'Mule albums
1998 albums